Future for Religious Heritage (FRH) is a non-faith, not-for-profit heritage organisation registered in Belgium, with members across Europe. FRH is a member of the European Heritage Alliance 3.3, an informal European sectoral platform. The association was a stakeholder of the European Year of Cultural Heritage 2018.

Purpose 
"Begun as a grass-roots movement in 2009, the Future for Religious Heritage took shape in 2011 as a network of groups from more than 30 countries, dedicated to finding ways to keep churches, synagogues and other religious buildings open, if not for services, then for other uses."
FRH has an office in Brussels.

Members 
Its members include the National Museum of Denmark, the Archbishopric of Prague, Chorus Venezia, Din l-Art Ħelwa, Museum Catharijneconvent, the Department for Cultural Heritage Conservation of the Church of Sweden, the Churches Conservation Trust, the Diocese of London, English Heritage, Friends of Friendless Churches, The Historic Religious Buildings Alliance, Jewish Heritage UK, the National Churches Trust, Scotland's Churches Trust,  Culture Directorate of Government of Cantabria, among many others.

Activities 
FRH bring the voice of the sector to the European Institutions, while also working with its members to facilitate the development of cross border projects. 

These projects aim to fully exploit the potential of religious heritage in its various aspects:

 Cultural value

Sacred buildings, their contents and their history represent the biggest single portfolio of Europe’s historic patrimony.

 Social potential

Religious buildings bind communities together through the worship and non-worship activities that take place within them. They are often the only public buildings remaining.

 Economic potential

Places of worship attract visitors from afar and from nearby. Religious buildings represent five out of ten of Europe’s most visited sites and make a major contribution to tourism GDP.

 Environmental potential

Their physical presence marks the cityscape or rural environment.

References 

 Nederlands Dagblad, "Kerkgebouwen sleutel Europese identiteit", 5 June 2014, https://web.archive.org/web/20160304050245/http://www.frh-europe.org/wp-content/uploads/2014/06/NDagblad-artikel-Churches-Key-for-European-Identity.pdf
 SIR Europa, "Chiesa da custodire", Num. 78 (2134) - 15 November 2013, http://www.agenziasir.it/pls/sir/v4_s2doc_b2.europa?tema=Sir+Europa+italiano&argomento=dettaglio&id_oggetto=274493
 Reformatorisch Dagblad, "Veel Europeanen zien belang religieus erfgoed in", 3 June 2014, http://www.refdag.nl/kerkplein/kerknieuws/veel_europeanen_zien_belang_religieus_erfgoed_in_1_832151
 Vårt Land, "Gudshus forsvinner i raskt tempo", 17 December 2012, https://web.archive.org/web/20160304050146/http://www.frh-europe.org/wp-content/uploads/2012/11/2012-12-17-Gudshus-forsvinner-i-raskt-tempo.pdf
 Sustainable Management of Historic Rural Churches, "Europe Seeks New Action to Save Religious Heritage", Ann Vainlo, 25 November 2011, https://web.archive.org/web/20160303223511/http://smcproject.org.ee/europe-seeks-new-action-to-save-religious-heritage/
 KA Norway, "Fremtiden for Europas religiøse kulturarv på dagsorden i Venezia", 22 November 2012, https://archive.today/20140818112218/http://www.ka.no/sak/article/131828

External links
 Official website http://www.frh-europe.org/

History organisations based in Belgium
Historic preservation organizations